William Tisdale also written Tisdall (c. 1570–?) was an English musician and composer of the virginal school. No conclusive evidence about him has yet been discovered. Two William Tisdales have been found in London at the turn of the 17th century: one died in 1603 and the other in 1605.

All Tisdale's known music is represented by five pieces in the Fitzwilliam Virginal Book and two pieces in the so-called John Bull Virginal Book which was bound for the English composer John Bull.

Tisdale appears to have known the Tregians, a recusant family from Cornwall.  The Fitzwilliam Virginal Book includes his rich chromatic piece, Mrs Katherin Tregians Paven, possibly written on the death of Francis Tregian the Elder's mother, Katherine Arundell.  This link is one of the reasons why Francis Tregian the Younger has been suggested as the compiler of the anthology.

Music
From the Fitzwilliam Virginal Book:
 Almand (213)
 Pavana Chromatica: Mrs Katherin Tregians Paven (214)
 Pavana: Clement Cotton (219)
 Pavana (220)
 Galiarda (295)

From the John Bull Virginal Book:
 [Coranto] (3)
 [Coranto] (4)

References
 William Tisdall, Complete Keyboard Works, Howard Ferguson (ed.), Stainer & Bell, London 1970.
 Tisdale's Virginal Book, Alan Brown (ed.), Stainer & Bell, London 1966

English classical composers
English Baroque composers
Renaissance composers
16th-century English musicians
17th-century English musicians
1570s births
1600s deaths
16th-century English composers
17th-century English composers
16th-century classical composers
17th-century classical composers
English male classical composers
17th-century male musicians